Psychotria domatiata is a species of plant in the family Rubiaceae. It is endemic to Jamaica.  It is threatened by habitat loss.

References

domatiata
Vulnerable plants
Endemic flora of Jamaica
Taxonomy articles created by Polbot
Taxobox binomials not recognized by IUCN